Digeridoo is an EP by the musician Richard D. James under the alias The Aphex Twin, released in January 1992 on R&S Records. "Digeridoo" was previously released as "Aboriginal Mix" on the Analog Bubblebath Vol 2 EP. "Flaphead" and "Phloam" are the only new tracks on the EP.

"Digeridoo" does not contain an actual didgeridoo sample. Instead, James "labored for three days to concoct an electronic simulacrum of the primordial drone."

The track "Flaphead" on the CD version of the EP is extended by about 20 seconds compared to the vinyl version (here titled "Flap Head").

Track listing
All tracks by Richard D. James.

CD version

Vinyl version

References 

1992 debut EPs
Aphex Twin EPs